Andreas-Dimitrios Frangos (born ) is a Greek male volleyball player. He is part of the Greece men's national volleyball team. On club level he currently plays for the Greek club Panathinaikos.

References

External links
 profile at FIVB.org
 profile, club career, info at greekvolley.gr 

1989 births
Living people
Greek men's volleyball players
Olympiacos S.C. players
Panathinaikos V.C. players
Volleyball players from Athens